John Diamond may refer to:

John Diamond (bridge), American bridge player
John Diamond (dancer) (1823–1857), Irish-American dancer
John Diamond (journalist) (1953–2001), British broadcaster and journalist
John Diamond, Baron Diamond (1907–2004), British Labour politician
Jon P. Diamond (born 1957), American entrepreneur
John T. Diamond (1912–2001), New Zealand historian
John Diamond (doctor) (1934–2021), American doctor
John Diamond, 1980 children's novel by author Leon Garfield

See also
Jack Diamond (disambiguation)
John Dimond (disambiguation)
Jonny Dymond (born 1970), British journalist

Diamond, John